Chhutmalpur is a town in Saharanpur district  in the state of Uttar Pradesh, India.

Demographics
 India census, Chhutmalpur had a population of 14,274. Males constitute 52.27% of the population and females 47.72%. Chhutmalpur has a literacy rate of 79.46%, higher than the national average of 74.04%; with male literacy of 86.14% and female literacy of 72.15%. 14.14% of the population is under 6 years of age.

Bus connectivity 
Chhutmalpur is a  UPSRTC bus depot and has frequent bus connectivity to Saharanpur, Dehradun, Roorkee, Haridwar etc. It also falls on a number of interstate bus routes frequently connecting Delhi, Punjab, Haryana, Rajasthan, Himachal Pradesh with major towns in Uttarakhand.

Other modes of transport 
There are private 3-wheelers and minibuses that operate on Chhutmalpur-Saharanpur, Chhutmalpur-Roorkee and Chhutmalpur-Behat routes on shared basis.

Railway link
Chhutmalpur is not connected by railway network. Nearest railway stations are Saharanpur and Roorkee.

References

Cities and towns in Saharanpur district